A committee is a body of one or more persons that is subordinate to a deliberative assembly.

Committee may also refer to:

 The Committee (film), British film, with music by the Pink Floyd (1968)
 Alan Committie, South African comic actor and qualified high school teacher

See also
 Anti-Fascist Committee (disambiguation)
 Appropriations Committee (disambiguation)
 Banking Committee (disambiguation)
 Budget Committee (disambiguation)
 Committee of Public Safety (disambiguation)
 The Committee (disambiguation)